The wild camel (Camelus ferus) is a critically endangered species of camel living in parts of northwestern China and southwestern Mongolia. It is closely related to the Bactrian camel (Camelus bactrianus). Both are large, double-humped even-toed ungulates native to the steppes of central Asia. Until recently, wild camels were thought to have descended from domesticated Bactrian camels that became feral after being released into the wild. However, genetic studies have established it as a separate species which diverged from the Bactrian camel about 1.1 million years ago.

Currently, only about 1,000 wild camels are living in the wild. Most live on the Lop Nur Wild Camel National Nature Reserve in China, and a smaller population lives in the Great Gobi A Strictly Protected Area in Mongolia. There are also populations in the Altun Shan Wild Camel Nature Reserve (1986) in Qakilik County, in the Aksai Annanba Nature Reserve (1992), and in Dunhuang Wanyaodun Nature Reserve (now Dunhuang Xihu Wild Camel Nature Reserve) contiguous with the reserve in  Qakilik (2001) and a reserve in Mazongshan contiguous with the reserve in Mongolia, all in China.

Name
C. bactrianus is named after Bactria, a region in ancient central Asia. where the Bactrian camel was domesticated. The wild camel (C. ferus) and the domestic Bactrian camel (C. bactrianus) are separate species.

Description
Wild camels have long, narrow slit-like nostrils, a double row of long thick eyelashes, and ears with hairs to provide protection against desert sandstorms. They have tough undivided soles with two large toes that spread wide apart, and a horny layer which enables them to walk on rough and hot stony or sandy terrain. Their thick and shaggy body hair changes colour to light brown or beige during winter.

Like its close relative, the domesticated Bactrian camel, it is one of the few mammals able to eat snow to provide itself with liquids in the winter. While the legend that camels store water in their humps is a misconception, they are adapted to conserve water. However, long periods without water will result in a deterioration of the animal's health.

Differences from domestic Bactrian camels
Wild camels (Camelus ferus) appear similar to domesticated Bactrian camels (Camelus bactrianus) but the outstanding difference is genetic, with the two species having descended from two distinct ancestors.

There are several differences in size and shape between the two species. The wild camel is slightly smaller than the domestic Bactrian camel and has been described as "lithe, and slender-legged, with very narrow feet and a body that looks laterally compressed." The humps of the wild camel are smaller, lower, and more conical in shape than those of the domestic Bactrian camel. These humps may often be about half the size of those of a domesticated Bactrian camel. The wild camel has a different shape of foot and a flatter skull (the Mongolian name for a wild camel, havtagai, means "flat-head").

The wool of the wild camel is always sandy coloured and shorter and sparser than that of domestic Bactrian camels.

The wild camel can also survive on water saltier than seawater, something which probably no other mammal in the world can tolerate – including the domesticated Bactrian camel.

Behaviour
Wild camels generally move in groups of up to 30 individuals, although 6 to 20 is more common depending on the amount of food available. They are fully migratory and widely scattered with a population density as low as 5 per 100 km2. They travel with a single adult male in the lead and assemble near water points where larger groups can also be seen. Their lifespan is about 40 years and they breed during winter with an overlap into the rainy season. Females produce offspring starting at age 5, and thereafter in a cycle of 2 years. Typically, Bactrian camels seen alone are postdispersal young individuals which have just reached sexual maturity.

Distribution and habitat
Their habitat is in arid plains and hills where water sources are scarce and very little vegetation exists with shrubs as their main food source.

Wild camels travel over long distances, seeking water in places close to mountains where springs are found, and hill slopes covered in snow provide some moisture in winter. The size of a herd may vary up to 100 camels but generally consists of 2–15 members in a group; this is reported to be due to arid environment and heavy poaching. The wild camels are limited to three pockets in northwest China and some in southwest Mongolia. China spotted 39, and estimated that there were 600-650 camels in Altun Shan-Lop Nur reserves combined, in late 2018, with 48 spotted in Dunhuang reserve in 2018. At the Dunhuang and Mazongshan reserves, it had been estimated that one hundred camels exist per reserve, and for the Aksai reserve, it was estimated that there are nearly 200, according to an earlier estimation. In Mongolia, their population was about 800 in 2012.

In ancient times, wild camels were seen from the great bend of the Yellow River extending west to the Inner Mongolian deserts and further to Northwest China and central Kazakhstan. In the 1800s, due to hunting for its meat and hide, its presence was noted in remote areas of the Taklamakan, Kumtag and Gobi deserts in China and Mongolia. In the 1920s, only remnant populations were recorded in Mongolia and China.

In 1964, China began testing nuclear weapons at Lop Nur, home to many of the wild Bactrian camels. The camels experienced no apparent ill effects from the radiation and continued to breed naturally. Instead, their habitat became a restricted military zone where human activity was kept to a minimum. After China signed the Comprehensive Test Ban Treaty in 1996, the camels were reclassified as an endangered species on the IUCN Red List. Since then, human incursions into the area have caused a sharp drop in the camel population.

Status
The wild camel has been classified as Critically Endangered since 2002. The United Kingdom-based Wild Camel Protection Foundation (WCPF) estimates that there are only about 950 of them left in the world and its current population trend is still decreasing. The London Zoological Society recognizes it as the eighth most endangered large mammal in the world, and it is on the critically endangered list. The wild camel was identified as one of the top ten "focal species" in 2007 by the Evolutionarily Distinct and Globally Endangered (EDGE) project, which prioritises unique and threatened species for conservation.[29]

Observations made during five field expeditions starting in 1993 by John Hare and the WCPF suggest that the surviving populations may be facing an 80% decline within the next 30 years. According to the International Union for Conservation of Nature and Natural Resources (IUCN) its status was critical in the 1960s and gradually declined to critically endangered (Criteria: A3de + 4ade) status in 2000–2004 (IUCN 2004).

Threats
Wild camels face many threats. The main threat is climate change. In the Gobi Reserve Area, 25 to 30 camels are reported to be poached every year, and about 20 in the Lop Nur Reserve. Hunters kill the camels by laying land mines in the salt water springs where the camels drink. Other threats include scarcity of access to water such as oases, attacks by wolves, hybridization with domestic Bactrians leading to a concern of a loss of genetically distinct populations or infertile individuals which could potentially ward off viable bulls from a large number of females during their lifetimes, toxic effluent releases from illegal mining, re-designation of wildlife areas as industrial zones, and sharing grazing areas with domestic animals. Due to increasing human populations, wild camels that migrate in search of grazing land may compete for food and water sources with introduced domestic stock and are sometimes shot by farmers.

The only extant predators that regularly target wild camels are gray wolves, which have been seen to pursue weaker and weather-battered camels as they try to reach oases. Due to increasingly dry conditions in the species' range, the numbers of cases of wolf predation on wild camels at oases has reportedly increased.

Conservation

Several actions have been initiated by the governments of China and Mongolia to conserve this species, including ecosystem-based management. Two programmes instituted in this respect are the Great Gobi Reserve A in Mongolia, set up in 1982; and the Lop Nur Wild Camel National Nature Reserve in China, established in 2000.

The Wild Camel Protection Foundation, the only such charity of its kind, has as its main goal conservation of the wild in its natural desert environment to ensure that their status does not transition to Extinct in the Wild. The actions taken by the various organizations, motivated and supported by IUCN and WCPF, include establishment of more nature reserves (in China and Mongolia) for their conservation, and breeding them in captivity (as captive females may calve twice every two years, which may not happen in the wild) to prevent extinction. The captive breeding initiated by WCPF in 2003 is the Zakhyn-Us Sanctuary in Mongolia, where the initial programme of breeding the last non-hybridised herds of wild camels has proved a success, with the birth of several viable calves.

The wild camel was considered for introduction at Pleistocene Park in Northern Siberia, as a proxy for extinct Pleistocene camel species. If this had proved feasible, it would have increased their geographic range considerably, adding a safety margin to their survival. However, in 2021, Bactrian camels were introduced, but these were of the domesticated variety.

See also

Dromedary
Camelus bactrianus, domestic Bactrian camel
List of animals with humps

Notes

References

External links

 Wild Camel Protection Foundation
 Planet Earth: "Deserts" shows footage of wild Bactrian camels from a two-month trek in the Gobi desert. It includes a "diary" section, explaining the difficulties in obtaining the footage.
 Journalist Aaron Sneddon Bactrian Camels at the Highland Wildlife Park Scotland
 Video showing Wild Bactrian camels eating snow.

Camels
Mammals of Mongolia
Mammals of China
Gobi Desert
EDGE species
Critically endangered animals
Critically endangered biota of Asia
Mammals described in 1878
Taxa named by Nikolay Przhevalsky
Critically endangered fauna of China